Sam Schröder defeated the seven-time defending champion Dylan Alcott in the final, 7–5, 6–0 to win the quad singles wheelchair tennis title at the 2022 Australian Open. It marked Alcott's final professional appearance. The final was played in the Rod Laver Arena.

Seeds

Draw

Bracket

References

External links
 Drawsheet on ausopen.com

Wheelchair Quad Singles
2022 Quad Singles